Lebbeke is a municipality located in the Belgian province of East Flanders in the Denderstreek. In 2021, Lebbeke had a total population of 19.560. The total area is 27.31 km².
Lebbeke is home to the chocolate factory Callebaut.

Events

Metal Female Voices Fest is a heavy metal music festival held annually in Belgium since 2003.

The Clay Cross in Lebbeke is a cyclo-cross race held in East Flanders.

Current and former inhabitants
Jean-Marie Pfaff, soccer player, played 64 times for the Belgium national team and was born in Lebbeke. He now lives in Brasschaat.
Frank Vandenbroucke, international cyclist.

References

External links

Official website - Only available in Dutch

Municipalities of East Flanders
Populated places in East Flanders